Jonas Kippersund Rønningen (born 27 November 1990) is a Norwegian footballer who plys for OBOS-ligaen club Kongsvinger.

Career

Kristiansund BK
On 3 January 2019 it was announced, that Kristiansund BK would not extend Rønningen's expiring contract.

Career statistics

References

1990 births
Living people
Sportspeople from Møre og Romsdal
Norwegian footballers
Eliteserien players
Norwegian First Division players
SK Træff players
Kristiansund BK players
Kongsvinger IL Toppfotball players
Association football midfielders